Apartment Building on Windsor Avenue and Brunswick St., also known as the Windsor Avenue Apartment Building, is a historic apartment building located in the Raleigh Court neighborhood of Roanoke, Virginia.  It was built in 1928, and is a two-story, "U"-shaped Tudor Revival style apartment buildings.  It is constructed of stone, brick, half timbering, and stucco.  The building enclosed a courtyard plaza with stone paved sidewalks, stone walls (2 contributing structures), historic post lights and two decorative pools with waterfall (2 contributing objects).  Also on the property is a contributing detached garage.

It was listed on the National Register of Historic Places in 2010.

References

Residential buildings on the National Register of Historic Places in Virginia
Tudor Revival architecture in Virginia
Residential buildings completed in 1928
Buildings and structures in Roanoke, Virginia
National Register of Historic Places in Roanoke, Virginia
1928 establishments in Virginia
Apartment buildings on the National Register of Historic Places
Apartment buildings in Virginia